The 1980 Soviet First League was the tenth season of the Soviet First League and the 40th season of the Soviet second tier league competition.

Final standings

Top scorers

Number of teams by union republic

External links
 1980 season. RSSSF

1980
2
Soviet
Soviet